Dame Patricia Rose Bergquist  (née Smyth, 10 March 1933 – 9 September 2009) was a New Zealand zoologist who specialised in anatomy and taxonomy. At the time of her death, she was professor emerita of zoology and honorary professor of anatomy with radiology at the University of Auckland.

Early life, family and education
Born Patricia Rose Smyth in the Auckland suburb of Devonport on 10 March 1933, Bergquist was the daughter of William Smyth, an electrician, and Bertha Ellen ( Penny) Smyth, a homemaker. She had a younger brother Norman and a sister Catherine. 

She was educated at Devonport Primary School, and then Takapuna Grammar School where she was dux in her final year. She then began studying at Auckland University College in 1950, graduating MSc with first-class honours in botany in 1956; the title of her master's thesis was Contributions to the study of the loxsomaceae. After completing a second MSc equivalent in zoology, she undertook doctoral studies at Auckland, obtaining her PhD, supervised by William Roy McGregor and John Morton, on the taxonomy of the Porifera in 1961. Bergquist was the first person to earn a doctoral degree from the University of Auckland.

In 1958, she married Peter Bergquist, a noted molecular biologist, and the couple went on to have one daughter.

Academic and research career
Following her doctorate, Patricia Bergquist studied overseas, initially at Yale University where she broadened her systematic expertise, before returning to New Zealand and becoming an educator and researcher at the University of Auckland on matters related to anatomy, taxonomy and zoology, with particular interest in the marine sponge. She felt a stable framework of higher level classification which would permit recognition of generic relationships and facilitate descriptions of new species was missing. When Bergquist received a Personal Chair at the University of Auckland, she was the first woman at that university to do so.

She co-authored (with Mary E. Sinclair) The Morphology and Behaviour of Larvae of Some Intertidal Sponges for the New Zealand Journal of Marine and Freshwater Research, which was published on 20 October 1967.

In 1979, Bergquist was conferred the degree of Doctor of Science by the University of Auckland, on the basis on 28 submitted publications.

Honours and awards
Bergquist was elected a Fellow of the Royal Society of New Zealand in 1982, and in 1989 she was awarded the Hector Memorial Medal by the Royal Society of New Zealand. In the 1994 New Year Honours, she was appointed a Dame Commander of the Order of the British Empire, for services to science. Her husband, Peter Bergquist, was appointed an Officer of the New Zealand Order of Merit, for services to science, in the 2012 Queen's Birthday and Diamond Jubilee Honours.

Legacy
Numerous sponges have been named in her honour, e.g, Xestospongia bergquistia  Fromont, 1991, Tethya bergquistae Hooper, 1994, Acarnus bergquistae Van Soest, Hooper & Hiemstra, 1991, Plakortis bergquistae Muricy, 2011, and Phyllospongia bergquistae Wahab & Fromont, 2020.

Bergquist featured as one of the Royal Society Te Apārangi's "150 women in 150 words" project in 2017.

See also 

 Taxa named by Patricia Bergquist

Death
Patricia Bergquist died of breast cancer in Auckland on 9 September 2009, aged 76.

References

1933 births
2009 deaths
New Zealand anatomists
Deaths from cancer in New Zealand
New Zealand Dames Commander of the Order of the British Empire
Deaths from breast cancer
Fellows of the Royal Society of New Zealand
People from North Shore, New Zealand
Academic staff of the University of Auckland
Yale University alumni
20th-century New Zealand women scientists
Women anatomists
New Zealand taxonomists
Women taxonomists
Women zoologists
Spongiologists
People educated at Takapuna Grammar School
20th-century New Zealand zoologists